{{DISPLAYTITLE:C17H17NO3}}
The molecular formula C17H17NO3 (molar mass: 283.322 g/mol, exact mass: 283.1208 u) may refer to:

 Morphinone
 Ro01-6128

Molecular formulas